Luny Tunes Presents La Mision 4: The Take Over is a compilation album featuring various artists from the reggaeton genre and presented by Luny Tunes. It was released on November 9, 2004. Although there were previous "La Mision" albums, Luny Tunes bought the right to use the name and continued the series with the La Mision 4.

Track listing

"Intro" (by Tempo, Wisin & Yandel, Getto y Gastam) 
"El Booty" (by Wisin & Yandel) (Produced by Urba & Monserrate)
"Todo Empezó" (by Tony Dize) 
"Tú Quieres Duro" (by Hector "El Father") 
"Pierde El Control" (by Aniel) (Produced by Nesty, Naldo, Luny Tunes, Nely)
"No Dejes Que Se Muera" (by Zion & Lennox) (Produced by Naldo)
"Siente El Flow" (by Baby Ranks) (Produced by Luny Tunes)
"Fiera Callada"  (by Varon) (Produced by Luny Tunes, Mr. G)
"Wiki Wiki" (by Yaviah, Wisin & Yandel) 
"No Me Puedes Comprender" (by Wibal & Alex) (Produced by Nesty, Nely, Luny Tunes)
"¿Qué Sabes Tú?" (by TNT) 
"Amor Perdóname" (by Karel)  
"¿Amigos Para Qué?" (by TNT) 
"Caliéntame" (by Wisin & Yandel) (Produced by Urba & Monserrate, DJ Blass)
"Sólo Mírame" (by Tony Dize) (Produced by Monserrate & DJ Urba)
"El Rolo" (by Alexis & Fido) (Produced by Luny Tunes)
"Misionando" (by Voltio) 
"Tú Te Entregas A Mí" (by Baby Rasta & Gringo) (Produced by Luny Tunes, Nely)
"Deja Que Se Suelte" (by Joan & O'Neill) 
"Métele" (by Nicky Jam) 
"Sal A La Disco" (by Angel Doze) (Produced by Nely, Luny Tunes, Naldo)
"Ven Esta Noche" (by Kartier) (Produced by N.O.T.T.Y, DJ Sonic)
"Ahora Es Que Es" (by Jenai) 
"Conmigo No" (by Varon)

Charts

See also
List of number-one Billboard Tropical Albums from the 2000s

References

Luny Tunes albums
Albums produced by Luny Tunes
2004 compilation albums
Albums produced by Nely